Proteuxoa euchroa is a moth of the family Noctuidae. It is found in the Australian Capital Territory, New South Wales, South Australia and Western Australia. The scientific name of the species was first published in 1902 by Lower.

References

External links
Australian Faunal Directory

Proteuxoa
Moths of Australia
Moths described in 1902
Taxa named by Oswald Bertram Lower